Leinthall Starkes is a small village and civil parish in north-western Herefordshire, England. It is about 7 miles south-west of Ludlow, and near the larger village of Wigmore. The road between the two runs through the village.

Leinthall Earls is situated to the south of the village.

Places of interest
In a field on the western side of the village, just off the road to Wigmore, there is an ROC post. It was opened in May 1961 and closed in October 1968.

References

External links

Villages in Herefordshire
Civil parishes in Herefordshire